Church of the Ascension is any church dedicated to the ascension of Jesus:

Canada
 Church of the Ascension (Ottawa)
 Church of the Ascension (Windsor, Ontario)

England
The Ascension, Lavender Hill
Church of the Ascension, Hall Green
Church of the Ascension, Malvern Link
Church of the Ascension, Lower Broughton

Jerusalem
Chapel of the Ascension (Jerusalem), at the site of the oldest Byzantine Church of the Ascension; now part of mosque
Russian Orthodox Church of the Ascension, Mount of Olives, Jerusalem; main church of the convent of the same name at At-Tur
Augusta Victoria Hospital, Jerusalem, which includes the German Protestant Ascension Church

Latvia 
 Ascension Church, Riga

Russia
 Church of the Ascension (Bataysk)
 Church of the Ascension (Chaltyr)
 Greater Church of the Ascension on Bolshaya Nikitskaya Street, Moscow
 Lesser Ascension Church on Bolshaya Nikitskaya Street
 Ascension Church, Yaroslavl
 The Church of Ascension built circa 1530 CE by the Grand Prince of Moscow
 Church of the Ascension, Susat, Semikarakorsky District, Rostov Oblast, Russia

Serbia
Church of the Ascension, Belgrade

Sri Lanka
Church of Ascension, Kudagama

United States
By state
 Church of the Holy Ascension, Unalaska, Alaska
 Church of the Ascension (Saratoga, California), in the Roman Catholic Diocese of San Jose in California
 Episcopal Church of the Ascension (Sierra Madre, California)
Church of the Ascension (Denver, Colorado), a Denver Landmark
 Church of the Ascension (Washington, D.C.)
 Church of the Ascension and Saint Agnes, Washington, D.C.
 Church of the Ascension (Clearwater, Florida)
 Church of the Ascension (Frankfort, Kentucky)
 Church of the Ascension (Mt. Sterling, Kentucky)
 Church of the Ascension, Chicago, Illinois
 Church of the Ascension (Fall River, Massachusetts)
 Holy Ascension Orthodox Church, Albion, Michigan
 Church of the Ascension (Atlantic City, New Jersey)
 Church of the Ascension, Episcopal (Manhattan), New York
 Church of the Ascension, Roman Catholic (Manhattan), New York
 Episcopal Church of the Ascension and Manse, Wellsville, Ohio
 Church of the Ascension (Pittsburgh), Pittsburgh, Pennsylvania
 Ascension Chinese Mission, Houston, Texas
 Ascension of Our Lord Catholic Church, Moravia, Texas

See also
 Episcopal Church of the Ascension (disambiguation)
 Ascension Convent in the Moscow Kremlin